Fangcun District was a former district in Guangzhou, Guangdong, China. It lay to the southwest of Guangzhou's modern downtown area and south of the Pearl River. It was established in 1949 after the Chinese Communist Party took over Guangzhou from the Kuomintang. In 2005, it merged with the Liwan District.

See also 
Fangcun, Guangzhou
Liwan District

References

1949 establishments in China
2005 disestablishments in China
Liwan District
Former districts of Guangzhou
States and territories established in 1949
States and territories disestablished in 2005